Innundir skinni is Icelandic musician Ólöf Arnalds second album. The album was produced by Sigur Rós band member Kjartan Sveinsson, who also worked with Arnalds on her debut album.  Skúli Sverrisson, Davið Þór Jónsson, Björk and Shahzad Ismaily all contributed to the album.

Innundir skinni was the first single from the album and was released on June 28, 2010. A music video was released for the song, directed by Asdís Sif Gunnarsdóttir.

The album was originally titled Ókídókí.

Track listing
Adapted from Amazon.
 "Vinur minn" – 2:09
 "Innundir skinni" – 2:55
 "Crazy car" – 3:21
 "Vinkonur" – 4:00
 "Svif birki" – 2:31
 "Jonathan" – 3:52
 "Madrid" – 4:52
 "Surrender" – 5:23 (duet with Björk)
 "Allt i guddi" – 3:28

References

External links
 One Little Indian U.S. press release
 Official Site
 Official Myspace
 [ All Music Guide]

2010 albums
Ólöf Arnalds albums
One Little Independent Records albums